Leche is an album released by Mexican rock band Fobia. The word "Leche" means Milk in Spanish. This was their third album.

Track listing
 Plástico (Plastic)
 Los cibernoides (The cibernoids)
 Fiebre (Fever)
 No me amenaces (Don't threaten me)
 "_"
 Miel del escorpión (The scorpion's honey)
 Perra policía (Bitch police)
 Regrésame a Júpiter (Take me back to Jupiter)
 Maten al D.J. (Kill the DJ)
 Tú me asustas (You scare me)
 Los cibernoides (The cibernoids)
 Jonathan Bonus track

Personnel
 Paco Huidobro: Guitar
 Leonardo de Lozanne: Vocals
 Cha!: Bass
 Iñaki: Keyboards
 Gabriel Kuri: Drums

1993 albums
Fobia albums